A list of adventure films released in the 1970s.

1970

1971

1972

1973

1974

1975

1976

1977

1978

1979

Notes

 
1970s
Lists of 1970s films by genre